The Nova Scotia Secondary School Students' Association (known commonly as the NSSSA or as "The N-Trip" to its members) is an organization in Nova Scotia, Canada run mainly by students in Grades 9 to 12, enrolled in a Nova Scotia secondary school. Its purpose is to foster growth of leadership skills among youth, primarily through the use of regional and province-wide annual leadership conferences. Every student enrolled in a secondary school in Nova Scotia is a member of this organization, regardless of whether they have ever attended an NSSSA event or not.

Organization
The NSSSA is run by a committee, who operate under the rules of a Constitution. There is an executive, consisting of an elected President who is typically either a student in either their last year of secondary school or their first year of post-secondary, as well two elected Vice Presidents, internal and external. The executive has responsibility for the whole organization and is responsible for chairing the directing committee, known as Provincial Cabinet, and sitting on the planning committee, known as Conference Committee. The NSSSA is also divided into six regions, each of which has its own Regional Cabinet which combines the responsibilities of both the Provincial Cabinet and the Conference Committee on a much smaller scale.

Provincial Cabinet
The directing committee is known as Provincial Cabinet, known as PC, and consists of a President, Vice-President External, Vice President Internal, Secretary, Treasurer, one Media Relations officer, two Conference Co-Chairs, two Inclusion Conference Co-Chairs, and twelve Co-Premiers (two from each region). The non-voting positions on the Provincial Cabinet include the Provincial Advisor, the Webmaster and Past President.
The Provincial Cabinet is responsible for the overall direction of the organization, as well as forming its policies and dealing with external affairs. Its primary focus is to make sure the organization runs efficiently, and to be a reporting body for the Conference Committee.

Conference Committee
The NSSSA holds at least eight conferences annually, one in each region, and one province-wide conference on the third weekend of May, as well as an Inclusion Conference for special needs students. Additionally, most regions host a conference for students in grade 9. The Conference Committee, known as CC, is responsible for organizing and running the Provincial Conference each year. The same Conference Co-Chairs who sit on Provincial Cabinet are also responsible for chairing and directing this committee, and are ultimately responsible for the proper running of Provincial Conference. The members of Conference Committee (besides the Co-Chairs) include a Secretary, two or three "3-Tions" officers (responsible for registration and accommodation of students), two Skillbuilding co-chairs (responsible for organizing the skillbuilders), three Public Relations officers, two W.E.N.D.Y. officers (responsible for organizing cheers and the talent show), two Welcoming co-chairs (responsible for making the welcoming email, planning the welcoming activity and planning the opening night activity), two Heads of Logistics, two Head Chaperones, one Head of First Aid and one Head of Mental Health First Aid. The non-voting positions on Conference Committee are the Committee Advisor.

The Conference Committee reports to the Provincial Cabinet.

Regional Cabinet
There are six regions within the NSSSA, corresponding roughly to the county divisions in Nova Scotia. Each of these regions holds its own conference every year for its member schools. These conferences are on a smaller scale than the Provincial Conference, so the duties of both province-wide committees are combined for the regions into one single committee, known as the Regional Cabinet (or RC). Each region has its own Regional Cabinet, and positions are modeled on a cross-section of the most important positions of Provincial Cabinet and Conference Committee. The Regional Cabinet is run by two Co-Premiers. The chief duty of every Regional Cabinet is to hold a small-scale Regional Conference modeled after Provincial Conference. Regional Conferences are also occasionally used as testing grounds for new ideas for Provincial Conference, as the Regional Conferences are always held before Provincial Conference every year.

All positions on every committee are held for one-year terms. This results in a high turnover rate, which has in the past led to inconsistencies in policy decisions. However, Lorne "Abe" Abramson, Provincial Advisor for currently 11 years has been able to keep the NSSSA relatively consistent overall, and few major changes have occurred in recent years to the organizational structure, apart from some renaming of positions.

Most positions on all committees are filled via appointment. However, there are elections for some positions at an Annual General Meeting, held during the Provincial Conference. The elected positions include the President, Vice-President, and all Co-Premiers. One of the first decisions made upon election of the President and Vice-President (although after the Provincial Conference) is the choosing of the Conference Co-Chairs for the following year. The President and Vice-President then appoint the Provincial Cabinet from among applicants, while the Co-Chairs appoint the Conference Committee, also from applications submitted. Regional Cabinets are filled by the Co-Premiers, also through the application process.

History
The NSSSA began as an idea in 1986 among two students at Halifax West High School in Halifax, Nova Scotia. The idea was based on an already established organization in Ontario known as the OSSSA (which has since been retired). The NSSSA was officially registered with the joint stock companies of Halifax in 1992, and the first Provincial Conference was held that same year. Known as L.I.N.K. (Leadership In Nova Scotia Kicks), it was sparsely attended, lasted for one day, and barely resembled the current structure of the NSSSA, but the enthusiasm generated by the conference was carried over to the next year, and conferences have been held every year. As attendance grew, further restructuring of the organization was needed, and the regions were formed shortly thereafter, with regional conferences becoming a reality in the mid-1990s.

Conferences

Provincial Conference
Every year, the NSSSA holds one four-day province-wide conference for all secondary school students. The conference is usually held at a university in Nova Scotia. Originally, the conference was held at St. Francis Xavier University in Antigonish, Nova Scotia, but in 2005 the Provincial Conference was moved to Acadia University in Wolfville, Nova Scotia and has been held there until 2015 when the conference returned to St. Francis Xavier University. Conference is always held on the third weekend of May, the weekend coinciding with the national Victoria Day holiday, from Thursday to Sunday.

There are six main groups of attendees at conference. The largest group by far are the delegates. Delegates are students who usually have not attended a Provincial Conference before (although they may have attended one or more Regional Conference(s)). These are the students who are usually not very familiar with the NSSSA, who are attending for the first time, or do not have a position of higher responsibility. The delegates are divided into groups of about 8 to 10, known as skillbuilding groups. In charge of the skillbuilding groups are the second group of attendees, the skillbuilders. Skillbuilders are students who have been to at least one Provincial Conference in a previous year, are familiar with the organization, and wish to take on a position of responsibility. The skillbuilders are the leaders in skillbuilding sessions, where the entire skillbuilding group meets by themselves and does activities with the intent of building self-esteem, leadership skills, and knowledge of self. Members of PC, CC, and Regional Cabinets are often skillbuilders as well during the actual period of conference. The skillbuilders are led by two Skillbuilding Co-Chairs who are members of Conference Committee. Another group of attendees are the advisors, who are teachers who are responsible for the students from their school. Advisors also attend sessions similar to skillbuilding sessions. The next group are the Logistics team. This is a team of usually 10-20 former members who have graduated from secondary school, but are too young to be a chaperone. The Logistics team shows up on the Tuesday before conference and are tasked with assisting Conference Committee (who also arrive on Tuesday) as CC gets everything ready and set up for the beginning of conference. During conference, the Logistics team assists anyone with questions they may have, particularly pertaining to where activities are, or where a skillbuilding group meeting area is. Logistics also takes attendance during all skillbuilding sessions to make sure that delegates have not gone missing without good reason to do so. The Logistics team is led by two Heads of Logistics who are also members of Conference Committee. There are also the Chaperones, also known as Chaps. Chaps are former members of the organization who are aged 19 or older and are still wanting to have some involvement with the NSSSA. Chaps enforce the "3D's" (see below) and other rules of conference, as well as ensure the safety of everyone attending. The primary duties of Chaps, aside from enforcing the rules, are to stay up at night in the university residences to make sure that everyone is safe, and that nobody leaves the residence without an escort after dark. These escorts are known as roamers, and their job is to shuttle delegates and skillbuilders (and off-duty Logistics members) from place to place, and to make sure that everyone arrives to their stated destination safely and promptly. Chaps sometimes do not take part in the daily activities of conference due to their being awake all night (and thus sleeping most of the daylight hours). The Chaps are led by two Head Chaperones, who make up the schedules and determine where the Chaps will be stationed, and act as a headquarters for Chaps as needed. The final group of conference attendees is the First Aid team, which is led by a Head of First Aid (an experienced person working in medicine as a paramedic, physician, nurse, etc.). The First Aid team is responsible for providing medical assistance as needed, and to help the Chaps ensure the safety of everyone at conference. All First Aid team members are fully trained in First Aid and CPR. In addition to these major groups of attendees, there are always some people who do not act in any capacity previously mentioned. These include the Provincial Advisor (who is not attached to a particular school, and leads the advisors in their sessions), a (usually) three-person DJ crew from 101.3FM The Bounce (though originally the DJs were from Sights and Sounds Entertainment) who provides music for meals, the dance, and corporate fair, and special guests such as motivational speakers and university liaisons, as well as the annual talent show. Since the return to StFX University, Impact Sound has been the provider for all sound equipment at the Provincial Conference.

Conference opens on Thursday morning, when Chaps, First Aid, and skillbuilders arrive and get settled. Skillbuilders set up tables to meet their delegates, and Logistics position themselves in important locations to assist anybody arriving who may have difficulty with luggage or locating where they need to go. Delegates and advisors begin arriving in early afternoon, and registration lasts all afternoon, with people usually milling about while they wait for everyone to arrive. A common tradition is to go meet as many people as possible. This is done with the help of a ball of small yarn strings called a warm fuzzy. A warm fuzzy is worn like a necklace around the neck. When a person first meets someone new, they pull a piece of string off their warm fuzzy (the piece of string is also known as a warm fuzzy) and, while introducing themselves by stating their name, grade, and school, they tie the warm fuzzy around the neck string of the other person's warm fuzzy. The meeting ends with a friendly hug. The warm fuzzy serves as a reminder of all the people that a conference attendee has met, and it is tradition to try to meet as many people as possible to obtain the maximum amount of warm fuzzies.

At NSSSA events, there is much emphasis placed on tradition. One NSSSA tradition is that of cheering. There is at least one cheer at most events, often led by the W.E.N.D.Y. people, and usually while people are arriving to keep up as much energy and enthusiasm as possible. There are a variety of cheers for every occasion, ranging from complete nonsense ("Fire engine, fire engine, stinky stinky tall") to cheers with the purpose of quieting the crowd when an event is about to start ("If you can hear me give me a one-two"). Another tradition is the "I Lost" game. It began when NSSSA was first formed and has continued to this day. The "I Lost" game is never-ending, and the objective is not to think of the game. If one remembers or is reminded of the game in any way, they immediately lose. Upon losing, the person must shout "I lost", to inform the other players that they have lost the game and are now out. This serves to remind all the other players in the vicinity of the game as well, which means that they all lose too, and all must shout that they lost as well. The only possible way to win the game is to forget that you even heard of it, and to stay away from anyone else playing, which is essentially an impossibility at conference. The game is not taken seriously, and players who have lost almost always continue playing. There is some confusion over the position of W.E.N.D.Y., and in particular the meaning of the acronym. It is tradition that extremely few people know for sure what the acronym truly means, and it is now said that the only people who know are the Provincial Advisor and the persons who invented the acronym. Not even the persons who fill the positions are privy to this information.

The first official activity of every conference (after registration) is supper. All meals for four days are provided in the university meal hall. At meals, the DJ crew plays music and once people are done eating, they are free to do what they like (within the rules). Often a spontaneous dance area forms in the meal hall near the DJ table, and many other people choose to go continue to meet other people, or play games. A popular game among NSSSA members is called "Pony". It involves two rotating circles of people, a cheer, and some closeness to other people, and it is a great way to break the ice if someone is shy at conference. People have jokingly commented over the years that "Pony" is the closest one can come to breaking the third "D" (see below) and still be following conference rules.

After the opening meal, there are Opening Ceremonies, usually consisting of short speeches by university directors, and introductions of PC and CC (with a humorous video accompaniment). There is also an explanation of the rules of conference. There are three major rules at conference that are absolute; these are called the "3D's". The "3D's" are:

 No Drinking
 No Drugs
 No Doing "It" ("it" consisting of any sexual or romantic gestures or activities)

These rules are very strict; if anyone is caught breaking a "D" they will be sent home at their own expense and their parent will be notified. Among other rules are that nobody (with the exception of Chaps, First Aid, and the Provincial Advisor, when necessary) is allowed in the residences of the opposite sex; i.e. no males are allowed in female residences, and vice versa. As well, nobody except Chaps and advisors are allowed to leave the university campus once conference begins. This is to ensure that nobody goes missing. In 2005 a new rule was put into effect that there were to be no "energy drinks" such as Red Bull or Sobe allowed on the university campus for the duration of conference. As well, students are not allowed to drive themselves to conference, following an accident that happened to three students on the way to the provincial dance one year. This rule was lifted in recent years due to a change in policies, but students are expected to follow transportation rules as outlined by their respective school boards. There are to be as little scents worn as possible to conference as well, though deodorant is a must. All these rules are vigilantly enforced by advisors, Chaps, and (to a lesser extent, and usually only during the day when most Chaps are sleeping) Logistics.

When Opening Ceremonies ends, the skillbuilding sessions begin. Skillbuilding sessions last anywhere from one hour to three hours, and there are eight of them spread across the four days of conference. Skillbuilding groups are usually eight to ten delegates and two skillbuilders in a room or area separate from other groups. During the sessions, there are activities such as games, puzzles, and discussions for the purpose of bringing the group closer together and allowing a genuine friendship to build up. The groups typically become very close by the end of the second or third session, with a real sense of trust among the members. Often the discussion gets very personal, and secrets are openly shared with newfound friends as one would share a secret with an old, very close friend. There is a sense of equality among group members and people frequently openly share ideas and take the lead of the group during activities. The skillbuilders' purpose is to introduce the activities and to keep the session moving, as well as to assist in the promotion of group closeness. Every session ends with a "debrief", which is a brief period where the group discusses the session's activities and tries to learn from them. The final session of conference is typically very emotional for group members due to the closeness and friendship created. The final session always follows the same format every year, and group members write "I Love You Because's" (short notes of praise for the other person, offering words of encouragement, and/or thanking the person for the experiences created during the four days). These are often very emotional messages and conference attendees treasure them for a long time. The skillbuilders send off their delegates with words of encouragement and a call to remember what they've learned and apply those lessons to their lives. Contact information is usually also shared. Many conference attendees state that their favorite thing about conference is the skillbuilding sessions, and some groups may stay in touch for years.

Following the skillbuilding session, there is usually a motivational speaker, a special guest invited to speak to the students. Following that, there is a W.E.N.D.Y. activity designed to entertain the attendees until they decide to go to bed, or the activity ends (usually around 2 am). In the past, this has included bands, comedians, games, and parties.

The remainder of the weekend normally does not follow an absolutely set pattern. However, most of the events occur each year. Some of these events include more skillbuilding sessions, more speakers, a corporate fair for local businesses to attempt to sell services to the attendees, plenty of free time, meals, and an Annual General Meeting to address the attendees on the state of the organization and elect new positions (usually held Saturday afternoon).

An event that is often very much looked forward to by all attendees is the talent show that occurs every year on Friday evening. Only delegates and skillbuilders are permitted to perform an act (although there may be a Chap/Logistics/Advisor involved in a delegate or skillbuilder's act, but the act must feature the student. As well, the advisors as a group traditionally open the show with a dance act). Many varied acts have appeared over the years, with students performing dances, playing songs on musical instruments, singing, performing skits, and even jumping rope on some occasions. Often some of the acts can become emotional for audience members, and in the case of a particularly good act that touches someone, they can give an "O" instead of merely applauding. A "standing O" is when an audience member, sensing that they have just witnessed something special, stands, raises their arms above their head and clasps their hands to form an "O" shape, and hums the sound of the letter "o". In the case of truly rare acts, where the audience member has been touched emotionally by the performance, they may give a "silent O", which is the same as a "standing O", but without the humming. It is truly an honour for a performer to receive an "O" (especially the silent version), because they are supposed to be quite rare and reserved for very special times only. However, it is up to the discretion of the audience member which degree of praise to give to a performer. The talent show typically lasts until the very early morning, upon which time persons may choose either to go to bed or to the common room to continue socialising with friends.

Another event that is highly anticipated is the dance which occurs on Saturday night. It is styled much like a typical high school dance, with some slight variations in music (typically there is less emphasis on Top 40 pop music and more variety). The major difference is that there is very little "grinding", as there would be at a normal high school dance, but it is not allowed as part of the third "D". The dance lasts three hours, and the final song, as opposed to being a slow song, is normally a song known by many. It is tradition for all the persons at the dance to stand in a circle for the final song (almost always Hey Jude by The Beatles, put their arms around the shoulders of the person next to them, and sing along. This is often another emotional moment for most.

The final day consists of the final skillbuilding session, two meals, and a closing ceremony after lunch. The closing ceremony consists of more speeches, usually a video or slide show of pictures and video of the weekend, and is followed by a barbecue. The closing ceremonies are fraught with emotion as people have become very close and have shared many experiences that one typically wouldn't with new friends. After closing ceremonies, conference is officially over, and people leave soon after. PC and CC usually stay an extra day or two to assist with clean-up and with any final tasks that may be required.

Regional conferences
Regional conferences are styled after the Provincial Conference, with many of the same activities occurring at both. The major difference is that regional conferences are on a much smaller scale (they can have anywhere from 12 to 500 attendees, depending on the region), and they take place over one night as opposed to three. Activities at regional conferences can vary. For instance, at certain conferences, there may not be a dance, while there may not be a talent show on others, all depending on individual region's resources. Regional cabinet organizes and runs their conference, and PC and CC attend all regional conferences to better assist in planning the Provincial Conference. In the past, regional conferences have occurred in late Winter, although in recent years they have been moved to late Autumn to better space out the conferences with the Provincial Conference. Typically, regional conferences take place at a public high school in the region. There are six of these each year. Metro, Strait, Chignecto, Sou-West, Valley, and Cape Breton-Victoria.

Inclusion Conference
The inclusion conference was held as a special conference for students with special needs for the first time in 2005; it was called G.O.A.L. The idea proved a success and a second inclusion conference was held in 2006 named G.R.O.W.T.H.  The Inclusion Conference Co-Chairs are responsible for organizing and running this conference, which occurs in early April each year.

Conference names
Every conference has a different name. The name of a conference is usually an acronym forming a short (usually three to five letters, although it has been as high as nine in the past in the case of one Valley regional conference (Stop Drop n' Roll standing for Students Taking Opportunities and Putting their Dreams Right On Path towards New Realizations On Learning and Leadership) word, with the letters standing for words that create a phrase usually related to leadership. Since 2014, the provincial conference has discontinued the use of acronyms in favour of a simple phrase, starting with Challenging the Status Quo 2014 and ending most recently with Rise Up 2018.

Provincial Conference names
 1992 - L.I.N.K. (Leadership In Nova Scotia Kicks)
 1993 - S.L.I.C.E. (Student Leadership In Constant Evolution)
 1994 - W.E.T. (We Excel Together)
 1995 - B.L.A.S.T. (Bringing Leadership And Students Together)
 1996 - F.L.Y. (Finding Leadership in Yourself)
 1997 - S.L.A.M. (Student Leaders Achieving More)
 1998 - W.I.L.D. (Working to Inspire Leadership Development)
 1999 - J.A.M. (Journey to Achieve Motivation)
 2000 - H.Y.P.E. (Helping Youth Positively Excel)
 2001 - S.L.I.D.E. (Students Leading In Diverse Environments)
 2002 - S.M.A.S.H. (Student Motivation Achieving Spectacular Heights)
 2003 - C.O.A.S.T. (Confidence in Our Actions Starting Today)
 2004 - R.E.M.I.X. (Redirecting Energy and Motivation Into X-cellence)
 2005 - J.U.M.P. (Journey to Understand My Potential)
 2006 - E.D.G.E. (Every Day Grab an Experience)
 2007 - A.G.E.N.T. (Achieving Goals and Empowering Nova (Scotian) Teens)
 2008 - S.T.O.R.M. (Students Teaching Others to Reach and Motivate)
 2009 - P.O.W.E.R. (Providing Opportunities While Encouraging Responsibility)
 2010 - B.E.Y.O.N.D. (Bringing Enthusiastic Youth Opportunities and New Directions)
 2011 - O.N.E. (Offering Navigation to Empowerment)
 2012 - F.O.R.W.A.R.D. (Finding Opportunities to Rediscover What Adolescents can Really Do)
 2013 - R.E.V.I.V.E. (Realizing Everyone's Values In Various Environments)
 2014 - Challenging the Status Quo
 2015 - Taking Charge
 2016 - Exceeding Expectations
 2017 - Reaching New Heights
 2018 - Rise Up
 2019 - Synergy
 2020 - Vision
 2021 - Refresh
 2022 - Sky's The Limit

Past Presidents

Cheers

The Cheer Bible
While there are many cheers and rituals of NSSSA, WENDYs are the only ones who know all of them, through a book passed from one WENDY to another known as the 'Cheer Bible.' As they each receive it, in turn, they are permitted to create and add their own cheers.

Popular cheers
Spirit War: A classic at NSSSA, students are split in two groups as the cheer goes on. It's usually done in a public place, when one or more students stands and yells out 'We've got spirit, yes we do! We've got spirit, how 'bout you?' The other students will then argue the same cheer back, and as the cheer continues, more and more students get involved, making each side appear to have 'more spirit.' Finally, when the students don't think it will get any louder, they all begin hopping, and yelling 'We got the most!' repeatedly.

Repeat After Me Cheers: These are all too common at NSSSA, and can be about many things. WENDYs usually initiate these, but any student can, really. They usually are not just words spoken aloud, but also actions to match the cheer. Some common repeat after me cheers are 'Little Red Wagon,' 'Hey Hey Superman,' and 'I was Eaten by a Boa Constrictor.'

References

External links
Official NSSSA Website
NSSSA Haven (an unofficial fan site created by members, no longer active)

Educational organizations based in Nova Scotia